The 2016 Summer Olympics cauldron was made for the 2016 Summer Olympics in Rio de Janeiro, Brazil. In fact, there were two cauldrons, one in the Maracanã Stadium for ceremonial use, and another on Rio's new waterfront Boulevard Olímpico, opposite the 19th-century Neoclassical Candelária Church, which was lit after the Opening Ceremony and remained alight throughout the Games. They both featured small flame cauldrons backed by much larger kinetic sculptures created by the American artist Anthony Howe. The ceremonial version spans  in diameter.

Howe, in his work, wished to "replicate the sun, using movement to mimic its pulsing energy and reflection of light." After the 2016 Summer Olympics the waterfront cauldron has remained in place as a reminder of the Games.

References

See also
 2008 Summer Olympics cauldron
 2010 Winter Olympics cauldron
 2012 Summer Olympics and Paralympics cauldron
 2014 Winter Olympics cauldron
 2020 Summer Olympics cauldron

External links
 

2016 establishments in Brazil
Cauldron
Olympic flame
Outdoor sculptures in Brazil
Sculptures in Brazil